Yanouh may refer to:
Yanouh, a Lebanese historic village in the district of Byblos.
Yanuh-Jat, a congregation of two villages Yanuh and Jat in the north district of Israel.
Yanouh, a Lebanese village in the southern district of Tyre.